Naceri (also spelled Naseri, or Nasseri) is an Arabic and Iranian surname, it may refer to:

 Mehran Karimi Nasseri (born 1942), Iranian refugee
 Mohammad Ashraf Naseri, Afghan governor
 Samy Naceri (born 1961), French actor

Arabic-language surnames
Iranian-language surnames